Thrikkakara North (Village) is a village in Ernakulam district in the state of Kerala, India.
It is part of Thrikkakara Municipality.

Areas in Thrikkakkara-Kakkanad Urban Area
Kalamassery
Thrikkakkara North
Thrikkakkara South
Kakkanad
Vazhakkala

Location

References

Villages in Ernakulam district